Lee Uk Tsuen, also transliterated as Lei Uk Tsuen, is a village Ha Tsuen, Yuen Long District, Hong Kong.

San Lee Uk Tsuen forms a part of Lee Uk Tsuen.

Administration
Lee Uk Tsuen is a recognized village under the New Territories Small House Policy.

History
At the time of the 1911 census, the population of Lei Uk was 48. The number of males was 32.

References

External links
 Delineation of area of existing village Lee Uk Tsuen (Ha Tsuen) for election of resident representative (2019 to 2022)

Villages in Yuen Long District, Hong Kong
Ha Tsuen